The Singapore Prison Service (SPS) is a government agency of the Government of Singapore under the purview of the Ministry of Home Affairs. It runs 14 prisons and drug rehabilitation centres in Singapore. Its responsibilities encompass the safe custody, rehabilitation and aftercare of offenders, and preventive education.

History

1800 – 1899
On 18 April 1825, the first batch of penal convicts arrived in Singapore and were housed in temporary huts along Bras Basah Canal. The philosophy of deterrence through punitive measures rather than rehabilitation was adopted. In 1847, a civil jail was built at Pearl's Hill but overcrowding remained a perennial problem and a continued punitive approach in prison management led to a high rate of recidivism.

1900 – 1999
Changi Prison, a maximum security prison, was built and operationalised in 1936 as a training ground for the reform and rehabilitation of its inmates. The Singapore Prison Service was institutionalised as a Department in 1946 and G.E.W.W. Bayly became its first Commissioner. On 1 November 1973, Quek Shi Lei was appointed Director of Prisons.

The Ministry of Home Affairs set up a Prisons Re-Organisation Committee to review the system of rehabilitation, industrial training and work discipline. A new system of classification was then adopted in which inmates were grouped into 16 classes under three broad categories.

On 1 January 1988, Tee Tua Ba took over as Director of Prisons, while Quek Shi Lei acted as an advisor to Singapore Prison Service and became CEO of the Singapore Corporation of Rehabilitative Enterprises (SCORE).

When Tee Tua Ba was posted to the Singapore Police Force (SPF) as Commissioner of Police on 1 July 1992, Poh Geok Ek took over the Directorship of Singapore Prison Service until 1 November 1998.

Another milestone in Singapore Prison Service's history was the official opening of Tanah Merah Prison and Changi Women's Prison/Drug Rehabilitation Centre on 23 April 1994 by Minister for Home Affairs Wong Kan Seng.

In 1998, Chua Chin Kiat took over as Director of Singapore Prison Service from Poh Geok Ek when the latter retired. Under Chua's directorship, the Singapore Prison Service organised a visioning exercise in January 1999 to collectively craft a shared vision and conduct a review of its mission to better accommodate the changing needs and expectations of its stakeholders and the public.

On 31 December 1999, at the groundbreaking ceremony for the redevelopment of Changi Prison Complex, Minister for Home Affairs Wong Kan Seng unveiled the new vision and revised mission together with the "Captain of Lives" tagline.

2000 – Present
On 3 January 2000, Kaki Bukit Centre was established as a prison school for inmates' education and skills learning. Teaching resources were centralised and more inmates were able to pursue further education.

Presently, the new Changi Prison or the Changi Prison Complex houses the most serious criminal offenders in the country, including criminal offenders who are serving long sentences (including life imprisonment) and those who have been sentenced to death. Changi Prison Complex serves as the detention site for death row inmates at Changi, before they are executed by hanging, traditionally on a Friday morning. It is also where judicial corporal punishment by caning is carried out. Caning sessions at Changi are held twice per week.

The Yellow Ribbon Project was also launched on 2 October 2004 to raise public awareness and acceptance towards ex-offenders and support their re-integration into society.

On 1 November 2007, Ng Joo Hee took over office from Chua Chin Kiat, the latter moving on to become the executive director or AETOS Security Management. In the same year, Selarang Park Prison/DRC was also transformed to a community supervision centre to manage inmates emplaced on community based programmes and released on supervision.

After two years as Director of Prisons, Ng Joo Hee moved on to become the Commissioner of Police. On 1 January 2010, Soh Wai Wah took over office as Director of Prisons. Soh oversaw the official opening of a new prison cluster in Changi Prison Complex - Cluster B, on 20 January 2010.

On 10 December 2012, it was announced that a new S$118.5 million Prison Headquarters of the Changi Prison Complex will be constructed by December 2014. The project was awarded to Sembawang Engineers and Constructors (Sembawang), which is owned by the Punj Lloyd Group Company. The new headquarters will have four buildings and several smaller ancillary buildings that will house office facilities, a multi-purpose hall, a club house and an auditorium. It will also be in closer proximity to Cluster A and Cluster B within Changi Prison Complex.

In October 2016, Desmond Chin replaced Soh Wai Wah as Commissioner of Prisons. Under his stewardship, SPS attained the Singapore Quality Award in 2019. Chin also oversaw various initiatives under SPS’ 2025 transformation plans. This includes Prisons Without Guards, which leverages technology to automate mundane and routine tasks, and Prisons Without Walls, where more inmates are supervised in the community to support their reintegration into society.

On 28 September 2020, Ms Shie Yong Lee, former Deputy Commissioner of Prisons (Policy and Transformation), became SPS’ first female commissioner.

Organisation
The Singapore Prison Service (SPS) is a uniformed organisation under the hierarchy of the Ministry of Home Affairs. Its responsibilities encompass the safe custody, rehabilitation and aftercare of offenders, and preventive education. SPS is made up of uniformed officers as well as civilian staff, including psychologists and counsellors

Organisation Structure
SPS currently administers 15 institutions. They make up SPS's line units and are grouped under five Commands – Cluster A and B contain five institutions each, which are situated within the Changi Prison Complex (CPC). Cluster C with two institutions is situated at the adjacent Tanah Merah Centre (TMC). The Community Corrections Command (COMC) oversees Lloyd Leas Community Supervision Centre (LLCSC), Community Rehabilitation Centre (CRC) and Selarang Halfway House (SHWH). In addition to them, the Operations and Security Command (OSC) oversees and manages CPC Security and the Prison Link Centres (PLCs).

SPS works towards its mission of ensuring the safe and secure custody of offenders and to rehabilitate them for a safer Singapore. Prison officers and SPS civilian staff, also known as Captains of Lives, contribute to this mission by equipping offenders with the right skills, attitude and values to become responsible citizens.

Related Initiatives

CARE Network
The Community Action for the Rehabilitation of Ex-Offenders (CARE) Network was formed in May 2000 to coordinate and to improve the effectiveness of various agencies engaging in rehabilitative works for ex-offenders in Singapore.

The CARE Network is the first formal structure that brings together key community and government agencies to promote seamless in-care to aftercare support for ex-offenders. The Network consists of 8 major community and government organisations responsible for the rehabilitation of ex-offenders.

Community-Based Programmes 
Overseen by the Community Operations Command (COMC), Community-Based Programmes represent a step-down approach to help offenders make a seamless transition from incare to aftercare by allowing them to serve the tail-end of their sentences in the community. These include the Home Detention Scheme, Halfway House Scheme and Work Release Scheme, where offenders are supervised and counselled by officers from different community and government agencies. In 2018, there were 1,098 inmates on Community Based Programmes, an increase of 15.4 per cent from the year before.

Technology 
In 2017, SPS announced its Prison Without Guards transformation plan, which uses technology to enhance operational capabilities and enable prison officers to take up higher order jobs.

iKiosk (2015)

Rolled out to all institutions in October 2015, iKiosk has multiple functions that allow inmates to perform self-service tasks. This includes submitting administrative requests (for example, asking for extra letter-writing materials), checking the status of these requests and redeeming privileges.

Digital Rehabilitation Records Management System (2017)

Launched as part of a pilot in Changi Prison Complex, the Digital Rehabilitation Records Management System automatically tracks inmate activities and attendance records through near field communications technology embedded within inmates’ wrist tags. Inmates can also make purchases by scanning their wrist tags at self-service vending machines.

Millimetre Wave Body Scanner (2017)

The Millimetre Wave Body Scanner is designed to screen and detect hidden or contraband objects under inmates’ clothing and reduce the reliance on physical searches.

Avatar (2018)

Avatar is a human behaviour detection system that uses facial recognition technology and video analytics to recognise aggression and detect abnormal activities in the cell. The system triggers an alert within 15 to 30 seconds of detecting such actions, which could include violence, fighting or suicide attempts.

DIRECT (2019)

Known as the Digitisation of Inmate Rehabilitation and Corrections Tool, DIRECT provides inmates with shared tablets that allow them to access apps such as e-books, e-news, e-letters and e-learning to support them in their rehabilitation.

Equipment
Although the SPS officers are armed with less-than-lethal weapons such as the Monadnock PR-24 side handle baton/knightstick (more commonly known as the T-baton) and pepper spray while on duty, they are trained in firearms, which may be issued depending on the circumstances.

Pistols
.38 Caliber Revolver- Taurus Model 85
9mm Semi-Automatic Handgun- Glock 19

Shotguns
Ithaca 37
Remington 870

Sub-machine guns
Heckler & Koch MP5

Assault rifles
M16 rifle
Vehicles

 Nissan Diesel - Bus
 Isuzu S7 - Bus
 Toyota Coaster - Bus
 Fiat Ducato - Van
 Iveco Daily - Van
 Toyota Hiace- Van
 Toyota Hilux - Pickup truck
Less-lethal options

 FN 303
 FN 303-P
 Pepperball TAC700
 Pepperball TAC-SF

In popular culture

Fictional television programs

Movies

Current affairs programmes

See also

 Changi Prison
 Ministry of Home Affairs
 Singapore Corporation of Rehabilitative Enterprises (SCORE)
 Singapore Prisons Emergency Action Response

References

Prison and correctional agencies
Organisations of the Singapore Government
Penal imprisonment in Singapore